Gali may refer to:
 Francisco Gali, a 16th-century Spanish sailor and cartographer
 Gali (town), a town in Abkhazia, Georgia
 Gali District, Abkhazia
 Gali Municipality, Autonomous Republic of Abkhazia
 Gali, Kermanshah31, a village in Kermanshah Province, Iran
 Gali, Zanjan, a village in Zanjan Province, Iran
 Toa Gali, a hero in Lego's Bionicle storyline
 Boutros Boutros-Ghali, due to a different transliteration
 Ghali (disambiguation), due to a different transliteration
 Galli
 Galli (disambiguation), due to a different transliteration

Pakistan

Gali refers to an alley or alleyway which is a narrow pedestrian lane in a city or a mountain path or a mountain valley. Galyat is plural of Gali. The following are some Galayat in Pakistan:

 Dunga Gali
 Ghora Gali
 Nathia Gali
 Khaira Gali
 Bara Gali
 Darya Gali
 Chehr Gali
 Galyat, plural of Gali in Urdu
 Jhika Gali
 Changla Gali
 Berin Gali